Abbi Pulling (born 21 March 2003) is a British racing driver. She currently competes for Rodin Carlin in F1 Academy, and is a member of the Alpine Academy programme.

Career

Karting 
Pulling got involved in motorsports at 8 years old and started karting competitively in 2013, at the age of 9. She mainly developed her karting career in Britain, winning the Super 1 National Junior TKM Championship twice in 2017 and 2018.

Ginetta Juniors and GT5 Challenge 
Pulling began her racing career in early 2018, taking part in the first three rounds of the Ginetta Junior Championship for Total Control Racing, with little success.

She continued racing in equal machinery the following year as she switched to the Ginetta GT5 Challenge. She was usually down in the midfield throughout the season, but finished on a high with two consecutive 6th-place finishes at Donington Park.

British F4 

In 2020, Pulling made her single-seater debut, racing in the F4 British Championship with JHR Developments. She finished the season 6th in the standings with four podiums to her name.

She re-signed for the team going into the 2021 season with aspirations to fight for the title, but failed to meet expectations before she eventually had to pull out in September due to lack of budget.

Formula Renault Eurocup 
In late 2020, Pulling made a one-off appearance in Formula Renault Eurocup at Imola driving for Fernando Alonso's team. She finished both races in last place as she struggled to find the pace.

W Series 
After taking part in pre-season testing at Anglesey Circuit in Wales, Pulling was announced on 11 June 2021 as one of five reserve drivers for the second season of the all-female Formula 3 championship, W Series. She made her debut at the third round of the championship at Silverstone, where she coincided with her coach Alice Powell. She qualified on pole for race one of the season-ending Austin double-header and achieved her first podium with 2nd place the following day—thus securing 7th in the standings and automatic qualification for the 2022 season.

Formula One 
In March 2022, Pulling was signed by the Alpine F1 Team as a member of their new Alpine Affiliate programme. Prior to the 2022 Saudi Arabian Grand Prix, Pulling and Aseel Al-Hamad became the first women to drive a Formula 1 car in Saudi Arabia. In 2023, Pulling was upgraded to a full-time member of the Alpine Academy and will compete in the all-female F1 Academy series.

Racing record

Career summary 

† As Pulling was a guest driver, she was ineligible for championship points.

Complete F4 British Championship results 
(key) (Races in bold indicate pole position) (Races in italics indicate fastest lap)

Complete Formula Renault Eurocup results 
(key) (Races in bold indicate pole position) (Races in italics indicate fastest lap)

† As Pulling was a guest driver, she was ineligible for championship points.

Complete W Series results 
(key) (Races in bold indicate pole position) (Races in italics indicate fastest lap)

References

External links 
 
 
 Profile at W Series

2003 births
Living people
British racing drivers
English female racing drivers
British F4 Championship drivers
Formula Renault Eurocup drivers
W Series drivers
F1 Academy drivers
Ginetta Junior Championship drivers
JHR Developments drivers
FA Racing drivers
Drivex drivers
Carlin racing drivers